Sunshine North is a suburb in Melbourne, Victoria, Australia,  west of Melbourne's Central Business District, located within the City of Brimbank local government area.

History

Sunshine North Post Office opened on 1 February 1958 as the suburb was developed.

Demographics

In the 2011 census the population of Sunshine North was 10,637, approximately 50.5% female and 49.5% male.

The median/average age of the people in Sunshine North is 37 years of age. 39.4% of people living in the suburb of Sunshine North were born in Australia. The other top responses for country of birth were 23.1% Vietnam, 5.1% Malta, 2.6% Italy, 2.1% India, 1.7% Philippines, 1.2% China, 1.0% Burma, 0.9% Poland, 0.8% Sudan, 0.8% Croatia, 0.7% New Zealand, 0.6% England, 0.6% Cyprus, 0.5% Greece.

31.8% of people living in Sunshine North speak Vietnamese. The other top languages spoken are 25.8% English only, 6.0% Language spoken at home not stated, 5.8% Maltese, 5.5% Cantonese, 4.7% Other, 3.6% Italian, 1.8% Spanish, 1.6% Arabic, 1.6% Greek.

The religious makeup of Sunshine North is 35.0% Catholic, 23.1% Buddhism, 12.8% No religion, 8.0% Religious affiliation not stated, 4.0% Islam, 3.3% Eastern Orthodox, 3.3% Anglican, 1.8% Baptist, 1.3% Other Religious Groups, 1.1% Christian, nfd.

The median individual income is $353 per week and the median household income is $882 per week.

The median rent in Sunshine North is $255 per week and the median mortgage repayment is $1426 per month.

Attractions
 Brimbank Park (only 4 km walk)
 Maribyrnong River Trail

Flora and fauna

Many native species exist along the Maribyrnong River on the eastern border of the suburb. Some species thrive in the area. The most abundant are;
 Rainbow lorikeet
 Common brushtail possum
 Flying foxes or fruit bat Pteropus
 Cockatoo
 Galah
 Eastern brown snake

Introduced species;
 European rabbit
 Red fox
 Feral cat

Sport

The suburb host former National Soccer League and current Victorian Premier League competitors Melbourne Knights FC at Somers Street. North Sunshine Football Club play at Dempster Park in the Western Region Football League.

See also
 City of Sunshine – Sunshine North was previously within this former local government area.
 Solomon Heights – the area is significant in its lack of development comparative to adjacent suburbs, despite being subdivided into 435 lots during the 1920s

References

External links
  Parks Victoria Brimbank Park page Sept 2007
  Maribyrnong River Parks Victoria page Sept 2007
  Maribyrnong Valley Parklands – See Parknotes

Suburbs of Melbourne
Suburbs of the City of Brimbank